Tendoy is an unincorporated rural service point in Lemhi County, Idaho, United States, located at  (44.9593700, -113.6447780) on State Highway 28, at an altitude of 4,842 feet (1,476 m). It consists of a small general store and house.  It was named for Tendoy, a prominent Lemhi Shoshone chief in the mid-19th century.

It is the nearest location to Lemhi Pass over the Bitterroot Range, where the Lewis and Clark Expedition first crossed the Continental Divide in 1805. Sacagawea, the Shoshoni woman who guided the Expedition, was born near Tendoy.  Lemhi Pass is a National Historic Landmark.

The site of Fort Lemhi is 2 miles north of Tendoy.

References

Unincorporated communities in Lemhi County, Idaho
Unincorporated communities in Idaho